was a Japanese long-distance runner. He competed in the men's 10,000 metres at the 1984 Summer Olympics.

References

1959 births
1990 deaths
Place of birth missing
Japanese male long-distance runners
Olympic male long-distance runners
Olympic athletes of Japan
Athletes (track and field) at the 1984 Summer Olympics
Asian Games bronze medalists for Japan
Asian Games medalists in athletics (track and field)
Athletes (track and field) at the 1986 Asian Games
Medalists at the 1986 Asian Games
Japan Championships in Athletics winners
New Zealand Athletics Championships winners
20th-century Japanese people